The women's high jump at the 2022 World Athletics Indoor Championships took place on 19 March 2022.

Results
The final was started at 11:05.

References

High jump
High jump at the World Athletics Indoor Championships